is a railway station on the Iida Line in the city of Iida,  Nagano Prefecture, Japan, operated by Central Japan Railway Company (JR Central).

Lines
Sakuramachi Station is served by the Iida Line and is 130.1 kilometers from the starting point of the line at Toyohashi Station.

Station layout
The station consists of a single ground-level side platform serving one bi-directional track. There is no station building, but only a platform built on top of the platform. The station is unattended.

Adjacent stations

History
Sakuramachi Station opened on 3 August 1923. With the privatization of Japanese National Railways (JNR) on 1 April 1987, the station came under the control of JR Central.

Passenger statistics
In fiscal 2015, the station was used by an average of 97 passengers daily (boarding passengers only).

Surrounding area
Iida Prefectural Fuetsu High School
Iida Police Station

See also
 List of railway stations in Japan

References

External links

 Sakuramachi Station information 

Railway stations in Nagano Prefecture
Railway stations in Japan opened in 1927
Stations of Central Japan Railway Company
Iida Line
Iida, Nagano